Lunar Prelude is the first EP by Dutch symphonic metal band Delain. It was released on 19 February 2016. This is the first album with Ruben Israel on drums and Merel Bechtold on guitar. The track "Turn the Lights Out" is inspired by Neil Gaiman's The Sandman.

Critical Reception
Sputnik Music gave the album 3-stars, but wrote "Nothing on Lunar Prelude is going to surprise you. Symphonic metal with huge hooks is the order of the day. If you like Delain, you’ll find plenty to enjoy here, too. If you don’t like this band, there isn’t a single thing Lunar Prelude can do to change your mind."

Track listing

Personnel 
Adapted from the EP booklet:

Delain
 Charlotte Wessels – vocals
 Timo Somers – lead guitar
 Merel Bechtold – rhythm guitar
 Otto Schimmelpenninck van der Oije – bass
 Martijn Westerholt – keyboards
 Ruben Israel – drums

Technical
 Martijn Westerholt – producer
 Ted Jensen – mastering
 Arno Krabman – drum engineering on "Suckerpunch", "Turn the Lights Out" and "Don't Let Go"
 Bas Trumpie and Imre Beerends – guitar and backing vocals recording on "Suckerpunch" and "Turn the Lights Out"; mixing on "Turn the Lights Out"
 Guido Aalbers – vocal recordings on "Suckerpunch" and "Turn the Lights Out"
 Oliver Philipps – additional guitars and additional vocal engineering
 Mikko P. Mustonen – classical arrangements
 Fredik Nordstrom and Henrik Udd – mixing on "Suckerpunch" and "Don't Let Go"
 Christian Moos – mixing on all live tracks
 Glenn Arthur – cover art
 Wandy van den Bogert-Elberse – artwork design
 Sandra Ludewig – photos

References

Delain albums
2016 EPs
Napalm Records EPs